Amos Ellmaker (February 2, 1787 – November 28, 1851) was a U.S. politician, attorney, and judge from Pennsylvania. He served as the Pennsylvania Attorney General and was the Anti-Masonic vice presidential candidate in the 1832 presidential election.

Born in Lancaster County, Pennsylvania, he established a legal career in Harrisburg, Pennsylvania after attending Litchfield Law School. During the War of 1812, he served as an aide to General John Forster. After serving in the Pennsylvania House of Representatives, Ellmaker accepted appointment as the Pennsylvania Attorney General. He returned to private practice in 1819 and helped found the Pennsylvania Railroad and the Philadelphia and Columbia Railroad.

From 1828 to 1829, Ellmaker served another term as Pennsylvania Attorney General. In 1832, Ellmaker was nominated as the Anti-Masonic vice presidential candidate. The ticket of William Wirt and Ellmaker took 7.8% of the national popular vote and won the state of Vermont. Ellmaker sought election to the United States Senate in 1834 but was defeated by James Buchanan. After the election, Ellmaker retired from politics and practiced law in Lancaster, Pennsylvania.

Education
Amos Ellmaker was born in Leacock Township, Lancaster County, Pennsylvania, the son of Nathaniel Ignatious and Elizabeth (Fellenbaum) Ellmaker.  He graduated from Princeton College in 1805, attended the  Litchfield Law School, and continued his legal studies under James Hopkins, the same Lancaster attorney who trained James Buchanan.  Ellmaker completed his studies in the Harrisburg office of Thomas Elder, whose daughter he later married.  In 1808, Ellmaker was admitted to the bar and began practicing law in Harrisburg.

Public service
On Jan. 13, 1809, at age 21, Ellmaker was appointed deputy attorney general for Dauphin County, Pennsylvania.

He served in the Pennsylvania House of Representatives in 1813 and 1814, elected from the legislative district composed of Dauphin and Lebanon Counties.

He volunteered for the militia during the War of 1812 and served in 1814 as aide-de-camp to Brigadier General John Forster during the Chesapeake Campaign.  While in this position, he was elected to the Fourteenth Congress from the congressional district consisting of Lancaster, Dauphin, and Lebanon Counties, but never filled that office.  On July 3, 1815 Ellmaker was appointed Judge of the Twelfth Judicial District of Pennsylvania, composed of Dauphin, Lebanon, and Schuylkill Counties.

Ellmaker resigned from the bench in December 1816 to accept Governor Simon Snyder's appointment as Pennsylvania Attorney General.  Governor William Findlay re-appointed him in 1818, and Ellmaker served until December 1819.

In 1817 Ellmaker declined an offer from James Monroe to serve as Secretary of War.  During his career, he also twice turned down offers of appointment as Secretary of the Commonwealth, and twice as justice of the Supreme Court of Pennsylvania.

In 1821 Ellmaker moved from Harrisburg to Lancaster, where he continued to practice law.

Pennsylvania Railroad Company
In 1823 Ellmaker was an original incorporator of the Pennsylvania Railroad Company.  In 1826 he was an original incorporator of the Columbia, Lancaster and Philadelphia Railroad, as was James Buchanan.

In May 1828 Ellmaker returned to the office of state Attorney General, and served until August 1829.

1832 Presidential Campaign
In 1832, Ellmaker was the candidate for Vice President on the Anti-Masonic ticket, with William Wirt as the candidate for president.  Wirt and Ellmaker won in Vermont, and received seven electoral votes.

In 1834 Ellmaker ran for the United States Senate, losing to James Buchanan.  After this election, Ellmaker retired from politics and continued the practice of law.

In 1838, the Lancaster Female Seminary was incorporated, with Ellmaker as one of the original 10 trustees.

Family life
In 1816 Ellmaker married Mary Rachael Elder (born 31 December 1799 at Harrisburg, PA; died 15 March 1866), the daughter of Thomas Elder.  They had two sons, Nathaniel (born 28 April 1817 at Harrisburg, Pennsylvania) and Levi (born 1828, Harrisburg, Pennsylvania).

Death and burial
Ellmaker died in Lancaster on November 28, 1851.  He was buried in the churchyard of St. James' Episcopal Church in Lancaster.

References 
Egle, William Henry Pennsylvania Genealogies: Chiefly Scots-Irish and German (1896).
Ellis, Franklin  History of Lancaster County, Pennsylvania : with biographical sketches of many of its pioneers and prominent men (1883)
Twentieth Century Biographical Dictionary of Notable Americans (1904).

External links 
 Amos Ellmaker at The Political Graveyard

|-

|-

1787 births
1851 deaths
Anti-Masonic Party politicians from Pennsylvania
Litchfield Law School alumni
Members of the Pennsylvania House of Representatives
Pennsylvania state court judges
People from Lancaster County, Pennsylvania
Politicians from Harrisburg, Pennsylvania
Politicians from Lancaster, Pennsylvania
Princeton University alumni
Pennsylvania lawyers
1832 United States vice-presidential candidates
19th-century American judges
19th-century American lawyers
19th-century American Episcopalians